Calliostoma kanakorum is a species of sea snail, a marine gastropod mollusk in the family Calliostomatidae.

Description
The height of the shell attains 6 mm.

Distribution
This marine species occurs off New Caledonia.

References

External links

kanakorum
Gastropods described in 2001